María Luisa Alcalá (26 March 1943 – 21 February 2016), was a Mexican actress and director.

Life

She became known for playing Malicha in El Chavo del Ocho. This character emerged in 1974 as a kind of replacement for La Chilindrina, played by María Antonieta de las Nieves while she was away for a year of the program. She continued with a successful career as a comedian participating in programs such as El Chapulín Colorado and Cachún cachún ra ra! and Dr. Cándido Pérez.

Alcalá  has made outstanding performances in telenovelas like Esmeralda, La usurpadora and El privilegio de amar. She served as host of two virtual stations in Mexico, working in Radio Hits Mix with its "Mix Stories of Grandma" and in DementeRadio.com with its "Tell me a story" productions by Juan Carlos Aguilar, producer and manager of María Luisa Alcalá, where he has interviewed personalities such as Eugenia León, Julio Vega, Lady Sensation, Beatriz Moreno, Gabriela Fernández, Evangelina Martínez, Ernesto Gómez Cruz, Polo Ortín, among others.

Alcalá created a work with Evangelina Martínez called "Tell me a story by Red Rice" on tour throughout Mexico. She directed Investigador privado... muy privado, Violación and La Alacrana. She is famous for the roles of Socorrito in Esmeralda, Filomena in La usurpadora and Malicha in El Chavo. She also played Claudia the maid in the sitcom Dr. Cándido Pérez.

Alcalá died on 21 February 2016 at the age of 73.

Filmography

External links

References

1943 births
2016 deaths
Chespirito actors
Mexican telenovela actresses
Mexican television actresses
Mexican film actresses
Mexican stage actresses
Mexican telenovela directors
20th-century Mexican actresses
21st-century Mexican actresses
Actresses from Mexico City
Mexican people of Spanish descent
Women television directors